Runde Lighthouse is a coastal lighthouse located on the island Runde in the municipality of Herøy in Møre og Romsdal, Norway. It was first lit in 1767. The lighthouse was automated in 2002; the residential buildings were vacated and have since been used as a self-service tourist station.

See also
 List of lighthouses in Norway
 Lighthouses in Norway

References

External links

 Norsk Fyrhistorisk Forening 

Lighthouses in Møre og Romsdal
1767 establishments in Norway
Lighthouses completed in 1767
Tourist huts in Norway